The River Wye is the fourth-longest river in the UK and forms part of the border between England and Wales.

River Wye or Wye River may also refer to:

Rivers:
 River Wye, Derbyshire, a river flowing from Axe Edge Moor, Buxton to the River Derwent
 River Wye, Buckinghamshire, a river flowing from the Chiltern Hills in Buckinghamshire down to Bourne End where it meets the Thames
 Wye River (Maryland), a tributary of the Chesapeake Bay, on the Eastern Shore of Maryland, United States
 Wye River (New Zealand), a minor river in the South Island of New Zealand
 Wye River (Victoria), a minor river in Victoria, Australia

Settlements:
 Wye River, Victoria, a tourist village on the west coast of Victoria, Australia

Other:
 Wye River Memorandum, a political agreement between Israel and the Palestinian Authority concluded near Wye River, Maryland

See also
 Wye (disambiguation)